Carlos Javier Mascaró Vildósola (24 July 1934 – unknown), known as Javier Mascaró, was a Chilean football manager and a goalkeeper.

Playing career
A goalkeeper, Mascaró is one of the few players who have played for the three greatest clubs in Chilean football: Universidad Católica (1942–46), Colo-Colo (1950) and Universidad de Chile (1951), becoming the first goalkeeper to do it before Adolfo Nef, Oscar Wirth and Paulo Garcés. A product of Universidad Católica youth system, he also played for Green Cross (1944), Santiago Wanderers (1947) and Everton (1948–49),.

In January and February 1944, he took part in two matches against the Punta Arenas team representing Universidad Católica, the second and the third matches in the history of that city versus any professional team, since it doesn't have professional football. The results were losses by 3–1 and 2–1.
For Santiago Wanderers, he made his debut in a match against Unión Española on 15 May 1947. For Colo-Colo, he made just one appearance, in a 2–2 draw against his former team, Everton, on 16 July 1950.

Coaching career
With an extensive career, he mainly developed it out of his country of birth. 

In Portugal he coached Olhanense (1954–55).

In El Salvador, he coached FAS, Atlante San Alejo, Juventud Olímpica, Universidad de El Salvador and Aguila.

In Peru he coached Porvenir Miraflores in 1971.

In Guatemala, he coached Comunicaciones, Xelajú MC, getting the league title in 1980, Municipal and Suchitepéquez.

He is one of the five Chilean coaches who have led Municipal along with Luis Grill Prieto, Jaime Hormazábal, Rolando Torino and Fernando Díaz. During his stint with Municipal, he led the team in just one derby against Comunicaciones.

In 1983 he coached Deportivo Saprissa in Costa Rica.

Personal life
Both his son, Javier "Chicho" Mascaró Vásquez, and his grandson, Javier Mascaró Jory, were noted rugby union players and coaches.

Honours
Xelajú MC
 Liga Nacional:

References

External links
 Javier Mascaró at CeroaCero 
 Javier Mascaró at MemoriaWanderers 
 Javier Mascaró at HistoriadeColoColo 

1934 births
Chilean footballers
Footballers from Santiago
Club Deportivo Universidad Católica footballers
Club de Deportes Green Cross footballers
Santiago Wanderers footballers
Everton de Viña del Mar footballers
Colo-Colo footballers
Universidad de Chile footballers
Chilean Primera División players
Association football goalkeepers
Chilean football managers
S.C. Olhanense managers
C.D. FAS managers
Comunicaciones F.C. managers
C.D. Águila managers
Club Xelajú MC managers
C.S.D. Municipal managers
Deportivo Saprissa managers
C.D. Suchitepéquez managers
Peruvian Primera División managers
Chilean expatriate football managers
Chilean expatriate sportspeople in Portugal
Chilean expatriate sportspeople in El Salvador
Chilean expatriate sportspeople in Guatemala
Chilean expatriate sportspeople in Peru
Chilean expatriate sportspeople in Costa Rica
Expatriate football managers in Portugal
Expatriate football managers in El Salvador
Expatriate football managers in Guatemala
Expatriate football managers in Peru
Expatriate football managers in Costa Rica
Place of birth missing
Date of death missing
Place of death missing